Extrema may refer to:
Extrema (mathematics), maxima and minima values
Extremities (disambiguation)
Extrema, Minas Gerais, town in Brazil
Extrema, Rondônia, town in Brazil
Extrema (band), Antiprotestionarialconstructionaryism